Johannes Østtveit (18 January 1927 – 9 July 2013) was a Norwegian politician for the Christian Democratic Party. He was born in Sauherad. He was elected to the Norwegian Parliament from Telemark in 1965, and was re-elected on one occasion. Østtveit was involved in local politics in Bø municipality between 1959 and 1975.

References

Johannes Østtveit's obituary 

1927 births
2013 deaths
Norwegian veterinarians
Norwegian School of Veterinary Science alumni
Christian Democratic Party (Norway) politicians
Members of the Storting
20th-century Norwegian politicians
People from Sauherad